Acanthocercus adramitanus, also known commonly as Anderson's rock agama or the Hadramaut agama, is a small species of lizard in the family Agamidae. The species is endemic to the Arabian Peninsula.

Geographic range
A. adramitanus is a found in Oman, Saudi Arabia, and Yemen.

Habitat

Description
The tail is long, about twice SVL. Females are slightly smaller than males. Females may be bluish, and males may be intensely blue.

Diet
A. adramitanus preys upon insects.

Reproduction
A. adramitanus is oviparous.

References

Further reading
Anderson J (1896). A Contribution to the Herpetology of Arabia with a Preliminary List of the Reptiles and Batrachians of Egypt. London: R.H. Porter. (Taylor & Francis, printers). 122 pp. (Agama adramitana, new species, pp. 31–33).
Barts M, Wilms T (2003). "Die Agamen der Welt ". Draco 4 (14): 4–23. (in German).
Schätti B, Gasperetti J (1994). "A Contribution to the herpetofauna of Southwest Arabia". Fauna of Saudi Arabia 14: 348–423. (Acanthocercus adramitanus, new combination, p. 366).
Sindaco R, Jeremčenko VK (2008). The Reptiles of the Western Palearctic. 1. Annotated Checklist and Distributional Atlas of the Turtles, Crocodiles, Amphisbaenians and Lizards of Europe, North Africa, Middle East and Central Asia. (Monographs of the Societas Herpetologica Italica). Latina, Italy: Edizioni Belvedere. 580 pp. 

Acanthocercus
Reptiles described in 1896
Taxa named by John Anderson (zoologist)